The Wrexham Built-up area (also known as the Wrexham Urban Area) is an area of land defined by the United Kingdom Office for National Statistics (ONS) for population monitoring purposes. It is an urban conurbation fully within Wrexham County Borough and consists of the urban area centred on the city of Wrexham and the historically industrial settlements to the west including Gwersyllt, Rhostyllen, Brymbo, Bradley and New Broughton.

The detailed methodology of the process used across the UK by ONS in 2011 is set out in 2011 Built-up Areas - Methodology and Guidance, published in June 2013. It is summarised as "..a ‘bricks and mortar’ approach, with areas defined as built-up land with a minimum area of 20 hectares (0.2 km2 / 0.077 mile2), while settlements within 200 metres of each other are linked. Built-up area sub-divisions are also identified to provide greater detail in the data, especially in the larger conurbations."

The total population of the built-up area defined on this basis in 2011 was 65,692 at the 2011 census making Wrexham the fourth largest built-up area in Wales, and largest in North Wales. The area accounts for almost half of the entire country borough's population of 136,055 residents in 2020, with the remainder living in Rhosllanerchrugog's built-up area of 25,362 residents or in various villages and towns in rural parts of the county borough.

Subdivisions 
The ONS provides sub-division statistics for the Wrexham Built-up Area.

See also 
 List of conurbations in the United Kingdom
 List of Welsh principal areas by population
 List of Welsh principal areas by area
 List of localities in Wales by population

References 

Geography of Wrexham County Borough
Urban areas of Wales
Demographics of Wales